The name Portnoy, sometimes spelled Portnoi, is a Jewish surname of Russian origin. The Russian word 'портной' translates as 'tailor'. 
The name may refer to:

People
Ana Portnoy (1950-2020), Argentine photographer
David Portnoy (born 1977), American businessman, founder of Barstool Sports
Edan Portnoy or Edan (born 1978), American rapper, DJ, and producer
Eddy Portnoy, American expert on Jewish popular culture
Elinor Portnoy, Israeli-born glass artist
Gary Portnoy (born 1956), American singer/songwriter
Jerry Portnoy (born 1943), American harmonica musician
Michael Portnoy (born 1971), American performance artist
Mitchell Portnoy (born 1959), American Epidemiologist and Health Care Economist
Vladimir Portnoi (born 1931), Soviet Olympic silver and bronze medalist in gymnastics
Mike Portnoy (born 1967), is an American drummer and songwriter

Fictional characters
Alexander Portnoy, the protagonist of Philip Roth's 1969 novel Portnoy's Complaint.
Jeff Portnoy, a fictional comedic actor played by Jack Black in the 2008 film Tropic Thunder.
Frankie Portnoy, a fictional thief in Aden Polydoros' 2021 novel The City Beautiful.

Musical groups
PORTNOY, British-Israeli folk rock duo formed in 2012

See also
Portnow
Portsoy

Occupational surnames
Russian-Jewish surnames